Juan Moreno may refer to:

Juan Moreno (pitcher) (born 1975), relief pitcher in Major League Baseball
Juan Carlos Moreno (baseball) (born 1975), Cuban shortstop
Juan Carlos Moreno (footballer)
Juan Moreno (taekwondo) (born 1971), American taekwondo practitioner
Juan Isidro Moreno (1924–2015), poet from the Dominican Republic
Juan Gabriel Moreno (born 1965), Colombian/American architect
Juan Manuel Moreno (born 1970), Spanish politician 
Juan Moreno (footballer) (Juan Moreno Fernández, born 1997), Spanish footballer